Franz Eduard Meyerheim (10 October 1838, Berlin - 5 April 1880, Marburg) was a German genre painter.

Life and work 
His father was the painter, Friedrich Eduard Meyerheim. His younger brother, Paul Friedrich Meyerheim also became a painter. His uncles, Wilhelm Alexander Meyerheim (1815–1882) and Hermann Meyerheim (fl.1860s) were artists as well.

His first art lessons were provided by his family members. In 1854, at the age of sixteen, he entered the Prussian Academy of Arts. Four years later, he transferred to the Kunstakademie Düsseldorf and had his first exhibition. He also travelled extensively, to Tyrolia, Belgium, Italy and Switzerland, making sketches of humble, rural people, who would be his primary subjects.

Following a reorganization of the Prussian Academy, he was appointed Professor of anatomical drawing, a post he held until 1878, when illness forced him to retire. He died two years later, while convalescing in Marburg, at the age of forty-two. The cause of death was given as a "softening of the brain" (encephalomalacia).

Sources 
 
 Extract from the Bénézit Dictionary of Artists @ Oxford Art Online

External links

 More works by Meyerheim @ ArtNet

1838 births
1880 deaths
German painters
German genre painters
Prussian Academy of Arts alumni
Academic staff of the Prussian Academy of Arts
Artists from Berlin